Joseph Byron Stannard (February 6, 1872 – February 22, 1952) was an American college football player and coach and dentist. He  served as the head football coach at Westminster College in New Wilmington, Pennsylvania in 1897 and Colgate University in 1899. Before coaching, Stannard played football first at Colgate under Spencer Ford and then at the University of Pennsylvania under George Washington Woodruff.

Stannard was born on February 6, 1872, in Linneus, Missouri, to Oscar and Francis Stannard. He graduated from the University of Pennsylvania School of Dental Medicine and began practicing dentistry in Bloomington, Illinois in 1903. Stannard died on February 22, 1952, at St. Joseph Hospital in Bloomington, after a two-week illness.

Head coaching record

References

External links
 

1872 births
1952 deaths
19th-century players of American football
American dentists
Colgate Raiders football coaches
Colgate Raiders football players
Penn Quakers football players
Westminster Titans football coaches
University of Pennsylvania School of Dental Medicine alumni
People from Linn County, Missouri
Coaches of American football from Missouri
Players of American football from Missouri